The gens Sanquinia was a minor plebeian family at ancient Rome, which rose out of obscurity in imperial times to attain the highest offices of the Roman state.  Members of this gens are first mentioned in the time of Augustus, and Quintus Sanquinius Maximus held the consulship under Tiberius and Caligula.  The family vanishes from history in the time of Claudius.

Origin 
Ronald Syme described the gens as Etruscan, thanks to an inscription found in Etruria.

Branches and cognomina
There may only have been a single family of the Sanquinii, as all of those occurring in history come from the same time and place, and only one other is added from inscriptions anywhere else.  The only attested surname, Maximus, seems to have been a personal cognomen, and was probably given to the consul Sanquinius either because he was the eldest brother in his family, or because he was the most illustrious of the Sanquinii.

Members

 Quintus Sanquinius Q. f., held a number of magistracies, including those of quaestor, tribune of the plebs, praetor, and proconsul, at the end of the Republic or beginning of the reign of Augustus.
 Marcus Sanquinius Q. f. Q. n., a triumvir monetalis in 17 BC.  His coins celebrate the Ludi Saeculares held by Augustus that year.
 Quintus Sanquinius M. f. Q. n. Maximus, consul suffectus in an uncertain year during the reign of Tiberius, and a second time under Caligula in AD 39.  He was praefectus urbi under Caligula, and governor of Germania Inferior under Claudius.  He died in office in AD 47.
 Sanquinius, one of the accusers of Lucius Arruntius, a man of unblemished character, during the tumult that followed the downfall of Sejanus.  The senate, weary of constant charges of treason, instead chose to punish the accusers.  He must be a different man than the consular Sanquinius, who had argued for amnesty and an end to the accusations.
 Sanquinia C. f., named in an inscription from Caere in Etruria.

See also
 List of Roman gentes

References

Bibliography
 Publius Cornelius Tacitus, Annales.
 Lucius Cassius Dio Cocceianus (Cassius Dio), Roman History.
 Joseph Hilarius Eckhel, Doctrina Numorum Veterum (The Study of Ancient Coins, 1792–1798).
 Dictionary of Greek and Roman Biography and Mythology, William Smith, ed., Little, Brown and Company, Boston (1849).
 Theodor Mommsen et alii, Corpus Inscriptionum Latinarum (The Body of Latin Inscriptions, abbreviated CIL), Berlin-Brandenburgische Akademie der Wissenschaften (1853–present).
Bartolomeo Borghesi, Œuvres complètes de Bartolomeo Borghesi, Paris, 1862.
 George Davis Chase, "The Origin of Roman Praenomina", in Harvard Studies in Classical Philology, vol. VIII, pp. 103–184 (1897).
 Paul von Rohden, Elimar Klebs, & Hermann Dessau, Prosopographia Imperii Romani (The Prosopography of the Roman Empire, abbreviated PIR), Berlin (1898).
C. H. V. Sutherland, Roman Imperial Coinage, volume 1 : Augustus–Vitellius (31 BC–69 AD), London, 1923 (revised 1984).
T. Robert S. Broughton, The Magistrates of the Roman Republic, American Philological Association (1952–1986).
Ronald Syme, Roman Papers, edited by Ernst Badian and Anthony R. Birley, 7 volumes, Oxford, 1979-1991.

Roman gentes